Petro Kovalchuk (born 28 May 1984) is a professional Ukrainian football defender.

Career

Club
In July 2007, Kovalchuk joined Kryvbas from Spartak Ivano-Frankivsk. Kovalchuk also played then for Dniester Ovidiopol and FC Lviv.

On 1 February 2011, Kovalchuk signed a 1.5-year deal with Chornomorets.

In March 2015, Kovalchuk moved to Tajikistan, signing for Tajikistan Higher League Champions FC Istiklol, leaving the club after his contract expired in January 2017.

In January 2017 he signed a contract with Maldivian football Club Green Streets, along with another two Ukrainian footballers. He made his debut for CGS in a match against Victory Sports Club on 25 February 2017.

Career statistics

Club

Honors
Istiklol
 Tajikistan Higher League (2): 2015, 2016
 Tajikistan Cup (2): 2015, 2016
 Tajik Supercup (2): 2015, 2016

References

External links
 Profile at FFU website
 Official Website Profile
 Profile on Football Squads
 

1984 births
Living people
Ukrainian footballers
FC Spartak Ivano-Frankivsk players
FC Chornohora Ivano-Frankivsk players
FC Kryvbas Kryvyi Rih players
FC Lviv players
FC Chornomorets Odesa players
FC Slutsk players
Ukrainian expatriate footballers
Expatriate footballers in Belarus
Expatriate footballers in Tajikistan
FC Istiklol players
Club Green Streets players
Expatriate footballers in the Maldives
Ukrainian expatriate sportspeople in the Maldives
Association football defenders
Ukrainian expatriate sportspeople in Belarus
Ukrainian expatriate sportspeople in Tajikistan
FC Prykarpattia Ivano-Frankivsk (1998) players
Ukrainian First League players
Tajikistan Higher League players
Sportspeople from Ivano-Frankivsk Oblast